Michael Pawson (born 13 January 1969) is a New Zealand cricketer. He played in 19 first-class and 35 List A matches for Central Districts from 1990 to 1996.

See also
 List of Central Districts representative cricketers

References

External links
 

1969 births
Living people
New Zealand cricketers
Central Districts cricketers
Cricketers from Masterton